Sarantsi (Bulgarian: Саранци) is a village in western Bulgaria. It is in the municipality of Gorna Malina, Sofia Province.

The village is 37 km northeast of Sofia and has its own railway station, which is 2 km away from the village.

History 
The old name of the village is Tashkessen, or Tashkesan. It is the site of the Battle of Tashkessen.

References 

Villages in Sofia Province